Reason is a 1996 compilation of songs by the hardcore punk band Violent Apathy.  The songs are from the early days of the band before the release of their album Here Today.

Track list 

 "Reason"
 "Immortality"
 "Hunger Strike"
 "Real World"
 "On Trial"
 "Vice Grip"
 "Ignorance Is Bliss"
 "Violent Apathy"
 "Hypocrite"
 "Live In"
 "Warning"
 "Society Rules"
 "Desperation Takes Hold"
 "I Can't Take It"

Personnel

 Andy Bennett II – 
 Richard Bowser – guitar
 Jim Forgey – bass guitar
 Tom Fuller – guitar
 Kenny Knott – vocals
 Eliot Rachman (II) – drums
 Todd Viser – bass guitar

References

Violent Apathy albums
1995 compilation albums